Kruszewnia  is a village in the administrative district of Gmina Swarzędz, within Poznań County, Greater Poland Voivodeship, in west-central Poland.

The village has a population of 151. It was the birthplace of the German general Erich Ludendorff and had his name from 1939 to 1945.

People 
 Erich Ludendorff (1865–1937), German general

References

Kruszewnia